Slovenia is situated at the crossroads of central and southeast Europe, touching the Alps and bordering the Adriatic Sea. The Alps—including the Julian Alps, the Kamnik–Savinja Alps and the Karawank chain, as well as the Pohorje massif—dominate northern Slovenia along its long border to Austria. Its part south of Sava river belongs to Balkan peninsula – Balkans.

The term karst originated in southwestern Slovenia's Karst Plateau, a limestone region of underground rivers, gorges, and caves, between Ljubljana and the Mediterranean.

On the Pannonian plain to the east and northeast, toward the Croatian and Hungarian borders, the landscape is essentially flat. However, the majority of Slovenian terrain is hilly or mountainous, with around 90% of the surface 200 meters or more above sea level.

Location
Slovenia's location is where southeastern and Central Europe meet, where the Eastern Alps border the Adriatic Sea between Austria and Croatia. The 15th meridian east almost corresponds to the middle line of the country in the direction west–east.

Geographic coordinates

Extreme geographical points of Slovenia:
 North: , Budinci, Šalovci,
 South: , Kot pri Damlju, Municipality of Črnomelj,
 East: , Pince–Marof, Municipality of Lendava,
 West: , Robidišče, Municipality of Kobarid.

Since 2016, the geodetic system of Slovenia with the elevation benchmark of 0 m has its origin at the Koper tide gauge station. Until then, it referred to the Sartorio mole in Trieste (see metres above the Adriatic).

Area 

 Total: 20,271 km2
 Land: 20,149 km2
 Water: 122 km2
 Comparison: slightly smaller than New Jersey

Borders 
 Land boundaries
 Total: 1,086 km
 Border countries: Austria 330 km, Croatia 670 km, Italy 280 km, Hungary 102 km
 Coastline: 46.6 m (~ 47 km)
 Maritime claims: 

The entire Slovenian coastline is located on the Gulf of Trieste. Towns along the coastline include:
 Koper
 Izola
 Portorož
 Piran

Regions

Historical regions 

The traditional Slovenian regions, based on the former division of Slovenia into the four Habsburg crown lands (Carniola, Carinthia, Styria, and the Littoral) and their parts, are:

 Upper Carniola (Gorenjska) (denoted on the map by U.C.)
 Styria (Štajerska) (S)
 Prekmurje (P)
 Carinthia (Koroška) (C)
 Inner Carniola (Notranjska) (I.C.)
 Lower Carniola (Dolenjska) (L.C.)
 Gorizia (Goriška) (G)
 Slovenian Istria (Slovenska Istra) (L)

The last two are usually considered together as the Littoral Region (Primorska). White Carniola (Bela krajina), otherwise part of Lower Carniola, is usually considered a separate region, as is the Central Sava Valley (Zasavje), which is otherwise a part of Upper and Lower Carniola and Styria.

Slovenian Littoral has no natural island, but there is a plan on building an artificial one.

Climate

Humid subtropical climate (Cfa) on the coast, oceanic climate (Cfb) in most of Slovenia, continental climate with mild to hot summers and cold winters (Dfb) in the plateaus and mountains on the north, subpolar (Dfc) and tundra (ET) climate above the treeline on the highest mountain peaks.  Precipitation is high away from the coast, with the spring being particularly prone to rainfall.  Slovenia's Alps have frequent snowfalls during the winter.

Terrain
A short coastal strip on the Adriatic Sea, an alpine mountain region adjacent to Italy and Austria, mixed mountain and valleys with numerous rivers to the east.

There is only one natural island in Slovenia: Bled Island in Lake Bled in the country's northwest. Lake Bled and Bled Island are Slovenia's most popular tourist destination.

Elevation extremes 
 Lowest point: Adriatic Sea 0 m (tide gauge station in Koper)
 Highest point: Triglav

Natural resources 
Lignite coal, lead, zinc, building stone, hydropower, forests

Land use
 Arable land: 8.53%
 Permanent crops: 1.43%
 Other: 90.04% (2005)
 Irrigated land: 100 km2 (2003)
 Natural hazards: minor flooding and earthquakes

Environment

Current issues
The Sava River polluted with domestic and industrial waste; pollution of coastal waters with heavy metals and toxic chemicals; forest damage near Koper from air pollution (originating at metallurgical and chemical plants) and resulting acid rain.

International agreements
 Party to: Air Pollution, Air Pollution-Persistent Organic Pollutants, Air Pollution-Sulphur 94, Biodiversity, Climate Change, Climate Change-Kyoto Protocol, Endangered Species, Hazardous Wastes, Law of the Sea, Marine Dumping, Nuclear Test Ban, Ozone Layer Protection, Ship Pollution (MARPOL 73/78), Wetlands, Whaling
 Signed, but not ratified:

See also 
 List of mountains in Slovenia
 Online map services of Slovenia
 Protected areas of Slovenia
 Slovene Riviera (Slovenska obala)

References

External links 

 – Geodesic Institute of Slovenia – Detailed Topographic and Orthophoto maps of Slovenia